SK Union Vršovice is a football club located in Prague-Vršovice, Czech Republic. It currently plays in the Prague Championship, which is in the fifth tier of the Czech football system.

Historical names
 1913 — SK Union Vršovice
 1950 — Spartak Vršovice ALBA
 1953 — TJ Plynárna Michle
    ? — TJ Spartak Kohinoor
 1969 — TJ Praha Vršovice 1870
 1991 — TJ Sokol Vršovice
 1992 — SK Union Vršovice
 1995 — SK Actherm Vršovice
 2006 — SK Union Vršovice

Honours
Prague Championship (fifth tier)
 Champions 2012–13

References

External links
 Official website 
 Profile 

Football clubs in the Czech Republic
Football clubs in Prague
Association football clubs established in 1913
1913 establishments in Austria-Hungary
Prague 10